The Principality of Samos was an autonomous tributary state of the Ottoman Empire from 1834 to 1912. The island of Samos participated in the Greek War of Independence and had successfully resisted several Turkish and Egyptian attempts to occupy it, but it was not included with the boundaries of the newly independent Kingdom of Greece after 1832. Instead, in 1834 the island was granted self-government as a semi-independent state.

Tributary to the Ottoman Empire, paying the annual sum of £2700, it was governed by a Christian of Greek descent though nominated by the Porte, who bore the title of "Prince". The prince was assisted in his function as chief executive by a 4-member Senate. These were chosen by him out of eight candidates nominated by the four districts of the island: Vathy, Chora, Marathokampos, and Karlovasi. The actual legislative power belonged to a chamber of 36 deputies, presided over by the Greek Orthodox Metropolitan. The seat of the government was the port of Vathy.

With the outbreak of the First Balkan War, Themistoklis Sofoulis landed on the island with a group of exiled Samians and swiftly took control: the Ottoman garrison withdrew to Anatolia, and on 24 November 1912, the island's parliament officially declared union with Greece. The unification took place officially on 2 March 1913.

History

During the Greek War of Independence Samos bore a conspicuous part, forming its own autonomous administration under the leadership of Lykourgos Logothetis. It was in the strait between the island and Mount Mycale that Konstantinos Kanaris set fire to and blew up a Turkish frigate, in the presence of the army that had been assembled for the invasion of the island, a success that led to the abandonment of the enterprise, and Samos held its own to the very end of the war. On the conclusion of peace the island was again handed over to the Turks, but since 1835 has held an exceptionally advantageous position, being in fact self-governed, though tributary to the Turkish empire, and ruled by a Greek governor nominated by the Sublime Porte, who bore the title of "Prince of Samos", but is supported and controlled by a Greek council and assembly.

The ancient capital, which bore the name of the island, was situated on the south coast at the modern Tigani, directly opposite to the promontory of Mycale, the town itself adjoining the sea and having a large artificial port, the remains of which are still visible, as are the ancient walls that surrounded the summit of a hill which rises immediately above it, and now bears the name of Astypalaea. This formed the acropolis of the ancient city, which in its flourishing times covered the slopes of Mount Ampelus down to the shore. The aqueduct cut through the hill by Polycrates may still be seen. From this city, a road led direct to the far-famed temple of Hera, which was situated close to the shore, where its site is still marked by a single column, but even that bereft of its capital. This fragment, which has given to the neighbouring headland the name of Capo Colonna, is all that remains standing of the temple that was extolled by Herodotus as the largest he had ever seen, and which vied in splendour as well as in celebrity with that of Diana at Ephesus. Though so little of the temple remains, the plan of it has been ascertained, and its dimensions found fully to verify the assertion of Herodotus, as compared with all other Greek temples existing in his time, though it was afterwards surpassed by the later temple at Ephesus.

Here a new town has grown up, well built and paved, with a convenient harbour.

Samos was celebrated in ancient times as the birthplace of Pythagoras. His name and figure are found on coins of the city of imperial date. It was also conspicuous in the history of art, having produced in early times a school of sculptors, commencing with Rhoecus and Theodorus, who are said to have invented the art of casting statues in bronze. Rhoecus was also the architect of the temple of Hera. The vases of Samos are among the most characteristic products of Ionian pottery in the 6th century. The name Samian ware, often given to a kind of red pottery found wherever there are Roman settlements, has no scientific value. It is derived from a passage in Pliny, Another famous Samian sculptor was Pythagoras, who migrated to Rhegium.

The authors of the "Samos" article in the Encyclopædia Britannica Eleventh Edition thought the prosperity of the island in 1911 bore witness to the wisdom of the semi-independent arrangement. Its principal article of export is its wine, which was celebrated in ancient times, and still enjoys a high reputation in the Levant. It exports also silk, oil, raisins and other dried fruits. The population in 1900 was about 54,830, not including the 15,000 Samians living nearby on the mainland. The predominant religion was Greek Orthodoxy. The metropolitan district included Samos and Ikaria. In 1900 there were 634 foreigners on the island (523 Greek citizens, 13 Germans, 29 French, 28 Austrians and 24 of other nationalities).

Pro-Greek agitation and the reaction of the pro-autonomy faction led to increased tensions, and in May 1908 the Prince, Andreas Kopasis, asked for the intervention of the Turkish military. The ensuing riots left several dead. With the outbreak of the First Balkan War, Themistoklis Sofoulis landed on the island with a group of exiled Samians and swiftly took control: the Ottoman garrison withdrew to Anatolia, and on 11/24 November 1912, the island's parliament officially declared union with Greece. The unification took place officially on 2 March 1913. Sofoulis remained for a while as the president of the interim government of Samos until April 1914, when he was appointed Governor General of Macedonia.

List of Princes of Samos

Notes

References
Attribution

External links

 

Ottoman Greece
States and territories established in 1834
States and territories disestablished in 1912
Political history of Greece
Principality
Tributary states of the Ottoman Empire